Charles Gardner (28 October 1908 – 9 December 2001) was an Australian cricketer. He played three first-class cricket matches for Victoria in 1934.

See also
 List of Victoria first-class cricketers

References

External links
 

1908 births
2001 deaths
Australian cricketers
Victoria cricketers
Cricketers from Melbourne